James B. Jarrard is a United States Army lieutenant general who serves as the deputy commanding general of United States Army Pacific since July 28, 2022. He most recently served as the chief of staff of the United States Indo-Pacific Command, succeeding Ronald P. Clark. He served as the Commanding General of the 25th Infantry Division from November 5, 2019, to July 23, 2021. Previously, he served as the Director of Operations of the United States Special Operations Command.

Born in Germany and raised in Gainesville, Georgia, Jarrard graduated from North Georgia College with a Bachelor of Business Administration degree in 1988. He later earned a Master of Science degree in military operational art and science from the Air University. His twin brother Joseph Jarrard is also an army major general.

References

Air University (United States Air Force) alumni
Living people
Place of birth missing (living people)
People from Gainesville, Georgia
Recipients of the Defense Superior Service Medal
Recipients of the Legion of Merit
United States Army generals
United States Army personnel of the Gulf War
United States Army personnel of the Iraq War
United States Army personnel of the War in Afghanistan (2001–2021)
University of North Georgia alumni
Year of birth missing (living people)